Spåtind is a mountain in Innlandet county, Norway. The mountain lies a few kilometers south of the border of Langsua National Park.

Spåtind is the highest mountain in the mountain area known as Synnfjell. There are numerous cabins situated around the mountain, the largest cluster being Hugulia on the southern side. On the western side there is a facility for alpine skiing and a hotel.

Name
The first element is the verb spå which means "predict" or "see into the future", but here it was used in the old sense which used to mean "to scout" (related to the German word spähen, the Latin word specio, and the English word spy). The last element is tind which means "mountain peak". The peak is visible from long distances over a large region.

See also
List of mountains of Norway by height

References

Etnedal
Nordre Land
Mountains of Innlandet